The Whippoorwill was a short-lived passenger train operated by the Chicago and Eastern Illinois Railroad (C&EI) between Chicago, Illinois and Evansville, Indiana.

The C&EI introduced the Whippoorwill in 1946 as a day train supplement to the express streamliners it operated in conjunction with the Louisville and Nashville Railroad (L&N). The Whippoorwill was one of the first new streamliners introduced after World War II, with completely new equipment delivered by Pullman-Standard. A C&EI advertisement in Trains magazine touted the "ultra-modern chair car accommodations" and "latest type passenger Diesel locomotives."

The train's original consist, as delivered by Pullman-Standard, included the following cars:

A famous publicity photograph, which the C&EI used long after the train's discontinuance, showed a single EMD E7 locomotive (#1102), leading these seven cars which made up the train's original consist. The photograph was colorized to accentuate the train's blue and yellow color scheme. The northbound train (#4) departed Evansville at 7:00 am and arrived in Chicago's Dearborn Station at 12:20 pm. The train then returned south (as #3) at 5:30 pm, arriving in Evansville at 10:50 pm.

The C&EI discontinued the Whippoorwill in 1948 after the L&N began running a section of the Georgian to Chicago over a similar schedule. The C&EI reassigned the Whippoorwill'''s equipment to the Georgian and the Humming Bird'' until finally selling most of it to the Illinois Central in the early 1960s.

References

External links 
The famous publicity photograph

Railway services introduced in 1946
Named passenger trains of the United States
Passenger trains of the Chicago and Eastern Illinois Railroad
Railway services discontinued in 1948